Su Dajin (born April 20, 1986) is a Chinese weightlifter. He got silver the World Weightlifting Championships 2011 held at Paris.

References

1986 births
Living people
Chinese male weightlifters
Weightlifters at the 2010 Asian Games
World Weightlifting Championships medalists
Asian Games competitors for China
21st-century Chinese people